Papad Pol - Shahbuddin Rathod ki Rangeen Duniya is an Indian television series which aired on SAB TV. It was based on characters by Shahabuddin Rathod.

Premise 
Shahabuddin Rathod is a well renowned name in the entertainment fraternity. Internationally he has travelled around the world and is passionate about his talent of bringing a smile to peoples’ lives through his stories and funny anecdotes about these set of characters through live stage shows and recorded cassettes for the last 40 years. Papad Pol is based on these imaginary characters who are a very simple, relatable middle-class people living together in a "Pol".

Cast 
Swapnil Joshi as Vinay Chand Parikh
Ami Trivedi as Kokila Parikh
Tapan Bhatt as Jayantilal Parikh
Alpana Buch as Kantaben Parikh
Vipul Vithlani as Ghanubha Darbar
Lavina Tandon as Ranjanba Darbar
Abhay Harpade as Batuklal Mehta
Dimple Kawa as Bhavnaben Mehta
Sunil Vishrani as  Labhchand Merai
Deepmala as Dakshaben Merai
Rehman Khan as Manubhai Patel
Tulika Patel as Hetal Patel
Amish Tanna as Jivla Patel

Reception 
As viewership fell, the show was given extension in early 2011 to improve but was finally cancelled in August 2011.

External links
 Papad Pol Official Site on SAB TV

References

Sony SAB original programming
Indian comedy television series
2010 Indian television series debuts
2011 Indian television series endings
Television series by Optimystix Entertainment